Fayrouz Benyoub (born 12 August 1995) is a French-born Algerian former footballer who played as a midfielder. She has been a member of the Algeria women's national team.

Club career
Benyoub has played for Toulouse FC and AS Muret in France.

International career
Benyoub capped for Algeria at senior level during the 2014 African Women's Championship.

References

1995 births
Living people
Algerian women's footballers
Women's association football midfielders
Algeria women's international footballers
Footballers from Toulouse
French women's footballers
Toulouse FC (women) players
AS Muret players
French sportspeople of Algerian descent